Pisto (also known as pisto manchego) is a Spanish dish originally from the Region of Murcia, Castilla La Mancha and Extremadura. It is made of tomatoes, onions, eggplant or courgettes, green and red peppers, and olive oil. It is usually served warm as a starter or to accompany another dish. It is often served with white rice, bread, a fried egg on top or with pieces of cured ham. It is also used as the filling for pasties and tartlets (empanadillas).

The dish is sometimes formally named pisto manchego, from its origins in the historical region of La Mancha (mostly situated in the region of Castilla La Mancha); it is also found in similar versions in Extremadura (pisto extremeño). Pisto a la Bilbaína, from Bilbao in the (Basque Country), is similar to pisto manchego but usually includes only courgettes and green peppers in tomato sauce, sometimes lightly scrambled with eggs.

See also
Galayet bandora (the Levant)
Huevos rancheros (Mexico)
Lecsó (Hungary)
Matbukha (North West Africa)
Menemen (Turkey)
Piperade (Gascon/French/Basque)
Shakshouka (the Mediterranean and Middle East)
Ratatouille

References 

Spanish soups and stews
Castilian-La Mancha cuisine
Basque cuisine
Eggplant dishes